Sipowicz is Polish surname:

 
 
 Andy Sipowicz, a fictional character from the television series NYPD Blue
 Katie Sipowicz, a fictional character from the television series NYPD Blue

Polish-language surnames